Wang Chen (died June or July 266 CE), courtesy name Chudao, was a Chinese historian, military general, and politician of the state of Cao Wei during the Three Kingdoms period of China. After the Wei regime ended in February 266, he continued serving in the government of the Jin dynasty. He wrote a five-volume text known as the Wang Chudao Collection (王處道集) or Wang Chen Collection (王沈集), which is already lost over the course of history. He also wrote 14 chapters of the Quan Jin Wen (全晉文).

Life
Wang Chen was from Jinyang County (晉陽縣), Taiyuan Commandery (太原郡), which is located southwest of present-day Taiyuan, Shanxi. His father Wang Ji (王機) died early so he was raised by his uncle, Wang Chang, who served as the Minister of Works (司空) in the Wei government. He was known for his literary talent and was employed by the regent Cao Shuang as a secretary. He was promoted to the position of a Gentleman Attendant (侍郎) later.

In 249, after Cao Shuang was ousted from power by Sima Yi, his co-regent, Wang Chen initially lost his appointment but was later restored to the civil service as a Palace Attendant (侍中). He co-wrote the 44-volume historical text Book of Wei (魏書) with Xun Yi and Ruan Ji. The Wei emperor Cao Mao, who was fond of reading, called Wang Chen a "Master of Literature" (文籍先生). In 260, when Cao Mao planned to launch a coup to seize back power from the regent Sima Zhao, he summoned Wang Chen, Wang Ye and Wang Jing to meet him in private and discuss their plans. However, Wang Chen and Wang Ye reported the plot to Sima Zhao instead, and Cao Mao ended up being assassinated by Sima Zhao's men. After Cao Mao's death, Sima Zhao awarded Wang Chen the title "Marquis of Anping" (安平侯) and 2,000 taxable households in his marquisate.

In 266, after Sima Yan (Emperor Wu), Sima Zhao's son, ended the state of Wei and established the Jin dynasty, Wang Chen continued to serve in the Jin government and held the appointments of a Master of Writing (尚書) and a Regular Mounted Attendant (散騎常侍). He died later that year and was posthumously awarded the title of a commandery duke (郡公).

See also
 Lists of people of the Three Kingdoms

References

 Chen, Shou (3rd century). Records of the Three Kingdoms (Sanguozhi).
 Fang, Xuanling (648). Book of Jin (Jin Shu).
 Pei, Songzhi (5th century). Annotations to Records of the Three Kingdoms (Sanguozhi zhu).

Year of birth unknown
266 deaths
3rd-century Chinese historians
Cao Wei generals
Cao Wei historians
Cao Wei politicians
Jin dynasty (266–420) generals
Jin dynasty (266–420) historians
Jin dynasty (266–420) politicians